Richard Rosenfeld (born December 20, 1948) is an American criminologist and Founders Professor at the University of Missouri–St. Louis.

Education
Rosenfeld received his B.A. in 1972 and his Ph.D. in sociology in 1984, both from the University of Oregon.

Career
After working as an assistant professor of sociology at Skidmore College for four years, Rosenfeld first joined the University of Missouri–St. Louis in 1989 as an assistant professor and research fellow at their Center for Metropolitan Studies. In 2007, he was appointed Curators Professor of Criminology and Criminal Justice at the University of Missouri–St. Louis, and became a Founders Professor there in 2014.

Research
Rosenfeld's research focuses on crime statistics and policies aimed at reducing crime, also known as crime control. In a 2014 study, Rosenfeld and his graduate student, Joshua Williams, found that most defendants in gun crime cases in St. Louis were young males with prior felony arrests, and that about 40 percent of people arrested for such crimes were never charged. His research has also found that half of all violent crime in St. Louis occurs in only 5 percent of the city's street blocks, most of which were in disadvantaged neighborhoods on the city's north side. A 2015 report authored by Rosenfeld and released by the Sentencing Project that found that there was no convincing evidence of the alleged Ferguson effect in St. Louis.  In 2016, he changed his mind stating that, "The only explanation that gets the timing right is a version of the Ferguson effect."

References

External links

Living people
University of Missouri–St. Louis faculty
American criminologists
University of Oregon alumni
Place of birth missing (living people)
1948 births
Presidents of the American Society of Criminology